Borgundøya or Borgundøy is an island in Kvinnherad municipality in Vestland county, Norway. The  island lies in the Hardangerfjorden, immediately south of the island of Fjelbergøya. The island has about 79 residents (in 2017), with about four larger village areas spread out around the island.

Borgundøya is only accessible by sea, either using ferries or personal boats.  There are regular ferry routes from Leirvik-Borgundøya-Fjelbergøya-Halsnøy-Utbjoa, connecting several islands to the mainland in Vindafjord at Utbjoa.

See also
List of islands of Norway

References

Islands of Vestland
Kvinnherad